Jenna May Dear (born 29 May 1996) is an English footballer who plays as a midfielder for FC Fleury 91 in the French Division 1 Féminine.

Career
Born in Hayes, Hillingdon, Dear spent her early years at the Reading FC Girls' Centre of Excellence and played for Yiewsley Predators and Hayes & Yeading Youth.

She joined Chelsea LFC at the age of 14, and went on loan to Watford Ladies in March 2015 for the first half of that season. She joined Everton LFC in January 2016, before moving to Sheffield in April 2017.

She has  since mid-August 2018 played for Vålerenga Fotball Damer in Norway. Before this, she played for  Sheffield F.C. Ladies.

International career
Dear has represented England at under-15 level, captaining the side at the age on 14. She made the move up to under-19 level, where she made her debut against Sweden on 15 July 2014, and has since represented the under-20 team.

References

External links 
 
 
 Jenna Dear at Sheffield FC Ladies

1996 births
Living people
Footballers from Hayes, Hillingdon
English women's footballers
Women's association football midfielders
Chelsea F.C. Women players
Watford F.C. Women players
Everton F.C. (women) players
Sheffield F.C. Ladies players
English expatriate women's footballers
Vålerenga Fotball Damer players
Toppserien players
Division 1 Féminine players
Expatriate women's footballers in Norway
English expatriate sportspeople in Norway
Expatriate footballers in France
FC Fleury 91 (women) players